Noorullah Munir is the former education minister of Islamic Emirate of Afghanistan from 7 September 2021 until 20 September 2022.

Policies
Munir has stated in 2021 that women may continue their education in accordance with sharia. However, he indicated that while subjects such as physics will remain intact, other academic subjects such as music must be in line with Islamic law.

References

Living people
Taliban government ministers of Afghanistan
Year of birth missing (living people)
Education ministers